The coat of arms of Brisbane is a historic icon; symbolising aspects of not only the City but also the eponymous Governor of New South Wales, Sir Thomas Brisbane.

Sir Thomas' preoccupation with the field of astronomy is indicated by the two mullets. The Stafford knot was the badge of the 38th (1st Staffordshire) Regiment of Foot in which Sir Thomas Brisbane entered the British Army as an Ensign in 1789.

The Caduceus is the symbol of Commerce and Peace, and is the emblem depicted for Hermes in his capacity as God and Protector of Commerce.

Two Gryphons support the design, together with the motto "Meliora Sequimur", which means "Let us pursue better things" in Latin. The Gryphon is one of the principal bearings in heraldry, and is frequently used as a charge or supporter. The chimerical creature is half eagle and half lion and legend states that when it attains full growth, it will never be taken alive. The wavy blue bar around the creatures' necks alludes to the city's location as a port on the river.

The palm leaves in the crest are a symbol of victory included as a compliment from the Council to the valour of Australian Defence Force.

Valour, honour and high-mettled attributes are conveyed by the leopard in the crest. The colours of the city, blue and gold, are indicated by the top wreath.

See also

Flag of Brisbane
Coat of arms of Queensland
Australian heraldry

External links
 City of Brisbane at Flags of the World

Brisbane
Brisbane
Brisbane
Brisbane
Brisbane
Brisbane
Symbols introduced in 1925